FC Isloch Minsk Raion (FK Islach) is a Belarusian football club based in Minsk, although it officially represents Minsk Raion and is named after the Islach River.

History 
The team was founded in 2007 as an amateur club. From 2007 until 2011, it played in the Minsk Oblast championship. In 2012, Isloch joined the Belarusian Second League and, after finishing 3rd in its debut season, won promotion to the First League.

Isloch represented Belarus at the 2013 UEFA Regions' Cup. Isloch has won its qualifying group and advanced to the final phase of the competition, held in June 2013. The team has turned professional since promotion to the Belarusian First League.

In 2015, Isloch was promoted to the Belarusian Premier League for the first time in its history.

In August 2016, it was alleged that Isloch Minsk Raion assistant manager, Uladzimir Makowski, and players Alyaksandr Lebedzew, Alyaksandr Tsishkevich, Aleksandr Budakov, Aleksandr Alumona and Andrey Paryvayew, were involved in fixing their match with Dinamo Brest on 30 April 2016.

In 2019, the club reached the semi-finals of the Belarusian Cup for the first time after beating BATE Borisov in the quarter-finals. The club was eliminated in the semi-finals by Shakhtyor Soligorsk.

Domestic history

Current squad

Honours

National
Belarusian First League (1): 2015

External links

References 

 
Football clubs in Belarus
Sport in Minsk Region
2007 establishments in Belarus
Association football clubs established in 2007